Vaccinium caesariense (New Jersey blueberry) is native to the Eastern United States. It is a species in the genus Vaccinium, which includes blueberries, cranberries, huckleberry, and bilberries.

Distribution and habitat
Vaccinium caesariense is a native perennial plant in the Eastern United States, and is especially prominent in the New Jersey area, hence its common name New Jersey Blueberry. It is found in the coastal states from Florida to New Hampshire, almost always in wetlands. Some of its native habitats include pine barrens, mires, upland meadows and woods, ravines, and mountain summits.

Description
Vaccinium caesariense has simple, small, oval green leaves during the summer and loses its leaves in the winter. This dicot exhibits a shrub growth habit, meaning this perennial, multi-stemmed woody plant is not likely to grow larger than 5 meters in height, particularly due to its numerous steming arrangements.

Cultivation
In commercial cultivation of Vaccinium caesariense, they are usually planted at the beginning of Fall or the end of Winter, with organic fertilizers such as manure compost and vermicompost. As the plants develop woody stems irrigation is only needed during very dry periods. The cultivated plants are grown in soil that is accommodating to acidophilic plants.

History
The blueberry is one of the few fruits eaten in North America that is native to the continent. Native Americans harvested the wild blueberries. Their special use in the plant is its function as a dye, coloring items. 
It is also known as a medication for ailing stomach issues. Early Euro-American immigrant settlers began incorporating the fruit as an ingredient in foods and as a medicine.

In New Jersey
New Jersey has developed environmental and agricultural programs to protect and develop the New Jersey Blueberry, such as the Blueberry Plant Certification Program and the Phillip E. Marucci Center for Blueberry & Cranberry Research & Extension.

Proclamation 
The New Jersey legislature issued a Proclamation for its native plant:

New Jersey hybrid
Although the species is still found growing in natural habitats, most of New Jersey's cultivated blueberries are a hybrid Highbush type. It was first developed by Elizabeth Coleman White, the daughter of a cranberry farmer, and introduced in Whitesbog, Burlington County, New Jersey. During harvest season, New Jersey farmers set up road-side farm stands and sell the fresh blueberries. The hybrid fruit, when frozen, maintains quality and taste upon thawing.

References

caesariense
Blueberries
Flora of the Northeastern United States
Flora of the Southeastern United States
Plants used in Native American cuisine
Plants described in 1910
Taxa named by Kenneth Kent Mackenzie